Ballads for Two is an album by trumpeter Chet Baker and vibraphonist Wolfgang Lackerschmid which was recorded in 1979 and first released on Lackerschmid's Sandra Music Productions label.

Reception 

The Allmusic review by Bob Rusch states "This was a record not so much of rhythm as of tonal coloring, pitch and reverberation. This was also an avant-garde Chet Baker, without gimmicks, just meeting an interest to expand and further develop: to invent, expand, create. This was also very beautiful creativity; art for art's sake. Wolfgang Lackerschmid played vibes in a manner owing itself more to Red Norvo and Gary Burton than Milt Jackson, and proved himself to be a creator and artist in his ebb and flow with the trumpeter. Bravos for both artists".

Track listing 
All compositions by Wolfgang Lackerschmid except where noted
 "Blue Bossa" (Kenny Dorham) – 3:51
 "Five Years Ago" – 3:49
 "Why Shouldn't You Cry"- 4:44
 "Dessert" (Wolfgang Lackerschmid, Chet Baker) – 6:58
 "Softly, as in a Morning Sunrise" (Sigmund Romberg, Oscar Hammerstein II) – 6:10
 "You Don't Know What Love Is" (Gene de Paul, Don Raye) – 7:53
 "Waltz for Susan" – 3:53

Personnel 
Chet Baker – trumpet
Wolfgang Lackerschmid – vibraphone

References 

Chet Baker albums
1979 albums
Wolfgang Lackerschmid albums